was a poet in Shōwa period Japan.

Tanaka was born in Hiroshima and was a graduate of Waseda University. Together with Satomi Ton, Yoshii Isamu and Kume Masao, he helped establish the literary magazine Ningen ("Human").

1890 births
1966 deaths
Writers from Hiroshima
20th-century Japanese poets